Odostomia occultidens, common name the hidden-toothed pyramid-shell, is a species of sea snail, a marine gastropod mollusc in the family Pyramidellidae, the pyrams and their allies.

Description
The length of the shell measures 1.5 mm. The minute, white shell is translucent, shining,  and smooth. The shell contains three whorls plus a prominent heterostrophe pullus. The  adult whorls are rounded, regularly increasing. The aperture is ovately-pyriform. The columella is arched, thin, with a minute plication, rather above the centre, which is invisible from a front view.

Distribution

References

 Iredale, T. & McMichael, D. F., 1962, A reference list of the marine Mollusca of New South Wales. The Australian Museum, Sydney, Memoir, 11:1-185
 Macpherson, J.H. & Gabriel, C.J., 1962. Marine Mollusca of Victoria. Melbourne Univ. Press, Melbourne. 475
 OBIS : Odostomia occultidens

External links

occultidens
Gastropods described in 1915